This is a list of television series based on comic strips. For the purposes of this list, a comic strip is a cartoon or sequence of cartoons that tell a story and were published in magazines and newspapers in the "comics" section, most commonly in a panel-high "strip".

Live-Action 
The Addams Family
The Addams Family (1964–1966)
The New Addams Family (1998–1999)
Wednesday (2022-present)
 Andy Capp (UK, 1988)
 Beakman's World (1992–1998)
 Betaal Pachisi (India, 1997)
 Blondie (1957)
 Blondie (1968–1969)
 Buck Rogers
 Buck Rogers (1950-1951)
 Buck Rogers in the 25th Century (1979-1981)
 Dennis the Menace (1959)
 Dick Tracy (1950–1951)
 The Dumplings (1976) 
 Flash Gordon
 1954 series
 2007 series
 Hazel (1961–1966)
 Historias de la puta mili (Spain, 1994)
 Jane (UK, 1982–1984)
 Makinavaja (Spain, 1995–1986)
 La parejita (Spain, 2008)
 The Phantom (1961, pilot episode)
 The Phantom (2011, miniseries)
 Quico, el progre (Spain, 1992-95)
 Terry and the Pirates (1952–1953)
 Steve Canyon (1958–1959)
 Um Menino Muito Maluquinho (Brazil, 2006)
 Valentina (1989)
 Wild Palms (1993)
 Woke (2020–2022)

Animated 

The Addams Family
The Addams Family (1973)
The Addams Family (1992–1993)
 The Adventures of Hijitus (Argentina, 1967–1974)
 Animal Crackers (1997–1999)
 Archie's TV Funnies – includes segments based on Dick Tracy, Broom-Hilda and other comic strips (1971)
 Baby Blues (2000–2002)
 Beetle Bailey and His Friends (1963–1989)
 Big Nate (2022)
 Billy the Cat (1996–2001)
 The Boondocks (2005)
 Chacha Bhatija (2016–2017)
 Committed (2001)
 Curiosity Shop – includes segments based on B.C. and Miss Peach (1971)
 Defenders of the Earth (1986–1987)
 Dennis the Menace
 Dennis the Menace (1986–1988)
 All-New Dennis the Menace (1993)
 The Dick Tracy Show (1961–1962)
 Dilbert (1999-2000)
The Drinky Crow Show (2008–2009)
 Fabulous Funnies (1978)
 Flash Gordon
 1979 series
 1996 series
 Fred Basset (UK, 1976)
 Free For All (2003)
Garfield
 Garfield and Friends (1988-1994)
 The Garfield Show (2009–2016)
 Heathcliff
 1980 series (aka Heathcliff and Marmaduke and before Heathcliff and Dingbat)
 1984 series (aka Heathcliff and The Catillac Cats)
 Iggy Arbuckle (2007)
 Kid Cosmic (2021)
 The Legend of Prince Valiant (1991)
 Little Lulu
 Little Lulu and Her Little Friends (1976–1977)
 The Little Lulu Show (1995–1999)
 Mafalda (Argentina, 1972)
 Mafalda (Argentina, 1993)
 McDull and Chinese Culture (2006)
 Moomin (1990–1992)
 Mother Goose and Grimm (1991–1992)
 Motu Patlu (2012–present)
 The New Shmoo (1979–1980) – Series featuring a character from the comic strip Li'l Abner.
 Nick Knatterton (1978)
 The Nutty Boy (Brazil, 2022)
 Ox Tales (1987–1988)
 Peanuts
 The Charlie Brown and Snoopy Show (1983)
 This Is America, Charlie Brown (1988–1989)
 Peanuts (2016)
 Snoopy in Space (2019)
 The Snoopy Show (TBA)
 Pelswick (2000–2002)
 Phantom 2040 (1994–1996)
 Popeye
 Popeye (1960–1963)
 Popeye and Friends (1976–1988)
 The All-New Popeye Hour (1978–1983)
 Popeye and Son (1987–1988)
 The Popeye Show (2001)
 Quads (2001-2002)
 Ronaldinho Gaucho's Team (Brazil, 2011)
 Rupert Bear
 The Adventures of Rupert Bear (UK, 1970–1977)
 Rupert (UK, 1991–1997)
 Rupert Bear, Follow the Magic... (UK, 2006–2008)

See also
 List of television programs based on comics
 List of comic-based television episodes directed by women
 List of films based on comics
 List of films based on comic strips
 List of films based on radio series
 List of comics based on television programs
List of Peanuts specials

References

Comic strips, List of television series based on
Television programs